Gakići is a village in the municipality of Konjic, Bosnia and Herzegovina. 
It is notable for reconstructing a local road, destroyed during the Bosnian war.

Demographics 
According to the 2013 census, its population was 10, all Bosniaks.

References

Populated places in Konjic